Events from the year 1410 in Ireland.

Incumbent
Lord: Henry IV

Births
William Welles: English-born statesman and judge in fifteenth-century Ireland

Deaths
 Domnell mac Áedh Ó Flaithbheartaigh, leader of Iar Connacht and Chief of the Name